Gabriele Maria Deininger-Arnhard (31 July 1855 in Munich – 19 October 1945 Rum, Tyrol) was a German-Austrian painter.

Life 
Her parents were Wilhelm Arnhard, a magazine editor in Munich and Anna Lenck from Augsburg.

She studied at the Royal School of Art in Munich. Afterwards, she attended classes with Julius Lange, and Franz Streitt. From 1880 to 1885, she worked as a landscape painter in Munich.

In 1885, she married the architect,  and moved to Innsbruck. 
They were based in Innsbruck-Wilten, Franz Fischerstrasse 9.
The artist also devoted herself to landscape painting in Innsbruck. 
She often assisted her husband in topographic-art-historical studies in the whole of Tyrol.

Reception 
Deininger-Arnhard painted mostly landscapes from the Tyrolean and Bavarian regions, but also depicted rural interiors, in oil and watercolor. She was best known for her depictions of the Ötztal. 
According to her own account, she painted more than 1,000 large-format oil paintings. 
These may be found in collections in various cities in Germany, Tyrol, Vienna, Paris, Holland, Switzerland, the Czech Republic, Hungary and North America.

Deininger-Arnhard's first solo exhibition as an artist was at the Tiroler Landesmuseum (Ferdinandeum). 
Other exhibitions followed at home and abroad. A series of Tyrolean landscape paintings appeared in the lithographic institution of Redlich as colored postcards.

From 1906, Deininger-Arnhard led a painting school for women in Innsbruck, which first saw success in 1907.

References

External links 

Tirols Künstler 1927

1855 births
1945 deaths
German women painters
Austrian women painters
19th-century German painters
19th-century German women artists
20th-century German painters
20th-century Austrian painters
20th-century German women artists
Artists from Munich